John Richardson Illingworth (26 June 1848 – 22 August 1915) was an English Anglican priest, philosopher, and theologian. He was a notable member of the set of liberal Anglo-Catholic theologians based in Oxford, and he contributed two chapters to the influential Lux Mundi.

Early life and education
Illingworth was born in London on 26 June 1848 to an Anglo-Catholic family, the second son of Edward Arthur Illingworth (1807–1883), chaplain to Middlesex House of Correction, and his wife, Mary Taylor. He was educated at St Paul's School, an all-boys public school in London. As a child, he worshipped at St Alban's Church, Holborn, and at All Saints, Margaret Street. He won both an exhibition and a scholarship to attend the University of Oxford. He then studied literae humaniores (classical studies) at Corpus Christi College, Oxford, and achieved first-class honours in both mods and greats, graduating in 1871 with a Bachelor of Arts (BA) degree.

In 1900, Illingworth was awarded an honorary Doctor of Divinity (DD) degree by the University of Edinburgh.

Career

From 1872 to 1883, Illingworth was a Fellow and Tutor of Jesus College, Oxford, and a Tutor of Keble College, Oxford. He was ordained in the Church of England as a deacon in 1875 and as a priest in 1876. From 1883 until his death, he was Rector of St Mary's Church, Longworth in the Diocese of Oxford. He was also a Select Preacher of the University of Oxford from 1882 to 1891 and of the University of Cambridge from 1884 to 1895. In 1894, he gave the Bampton Lectures at the University of Oxford; the series was titled "Personality, Human and Divine". He was made an honorary canon of Christ Church, Oxford, on 6 February 1905.

Personal life
In June 1883, Illingworth became engaged to Agnes Louisa Gutteres. They were married at St Bartholomew's Church in Nymet Rowland, Devon, on 2 August 1883.

Illingworth died on 22 August 1915 in Longworth, aged 67, and was buried at St Mary's Church.

Selected works

References

Footnotes

Bibliography

External links
 Online books by J. R. Illingworth

1848 births
1915 deaths
19th-century Anglican theologians
19th-century English Anglican priests
19th-century English Christian theologians
19th-century English philosophers
20th-century Anglican theologians
20th-century British philosophers
20th-century English Anglican priests
20th-century English theologians
Alumni of Corpus Christi College, Oxford
Anglican philosophers
Anglo-Catholic theologians
English Anglican theologians
Fellows of Jesus College, Oxford
People educated at St Paul's School, London
People from Oxfordshire
Philosophers of religion
Writers from London